The 2022 United States Senate election in South Dakota was held on November 8, 2022, to elect a member of the United States Senate to represent the State of South Dakota. Incumbent three-term Republican U.S. Senator John Thune, who is the Senate Minority Whip, was first elected in 2004, defeating Democratic incumbent Tom Daschle, the then Senate Minority Leader. He ran for reelection to a fourth term. The Democratic nominee was 26-year Navy, Air Force JAG Corps Veteran, and former college professor Brian Bengs. Thune was ultimately reelected.

Republican primary
On December 23, 2020, Trump said Thune would face a primary challenger after Thune refused to support a challenge of the 2020 Electoral College results, tweeting: "Republicans in the Senate so quickly forget. Right now they would be down 8 seats without my backing them in the last Election. RINO John Thune, 'Mitch's boy', should just let it play out. South Dakota doesn't like weakness. He will be primaried in 2022, political career over!!!" South Dakota Governor Kristi Noem stated she would not challenge Thune for the seat. On January 1, 2021, outgoing U.S. president Trump tweeted that Noem should challenge Thune in a primary, despite Noem previously saying she will not do so, instead running for re-election as Governor in 2022.

Candidates

Nominee
John Thune, incumbent U.S. Senator (2005–present) and Senate Minority Whip (2021–present)

Eliminated in primary
Mark Mowry, musician and rancher

Withdrew
Patrick Schubert, software executive

Declined
Marty Jackley, former South Dakota Attorney General (2009–2019) and candidate for Governor of South Dakota in 2018 (ran for Attorney General)

Endorsements

Polling

Results

Democratic primary

Candidates

Nominee
 Brian Bengs, U.S. Navy and Air Force veteran, and former Northern State University political science professor

Declined
 Brendan Johnson, former U.S. Attorney for South Dakota (2009–2015) and son of former U.S. Senator Tim Johnson
 Troy Heinert, Minority Leader of the South Dakota Senate (2019–present) from the 26th district (2015–present)
 Billie Sutton, former Minority Leader of the South Dakota Senate (2015–2019) from the 21st district (2011–2019) and nominee for governor in 2018

Libertarian convention

Candidates

Nominee
Tamara Lesnar, small business owner

General election

Predictions

Endorsements

Polling

Results

See also 
 2022 United States Senate elections
 2022 South Dakota elections

Notes

Partisan clients

References

External links
Official campaign websites
 Brian Bengs (D) for Senate
 John Thune (R) for Senate

2022
South Dakota
United States Senate